These are the official results of the Men's long jump event at the 1986 European Championships in Stuttgart, West Germany, held at Neckarstadion on 28 and 29 August 1986.

Medalists

Results

Final
29 August

Qualification
28 August

Participation
According to an unofficial count, 18 athletes from 13 countries participated in the event.

 (1)
 (1)
 (1)
 (2)
 (2)
 (1)
 (2)
 (1)
 (2)
 (2)
 (1)
 (1)
 (1)

See also
 1982 Men's European Championships Long Jump (Athens)
 1983 Men's World Championships Long Jump (Helsinki)
 1984 Men's Olympic Long Jump (Los Angeles)
 1987 Men's World Championships Long Jump (Rome)
 1988 Men's Olympic Long Jump (Seoul)
 1990 Men's European Championships Long Jump (Split)

References

External links
 Results

Long jump
Long jump at the European Athletics Championships